The 1963 All England Championships was a badminton tournament held at Wembley Arena, London, England, from 19–23 March 1963.

Final results

Men's singles

Section 1

Section 2

Women's singles

Section 1

Section 2

+ seeded player

References

All England Open Badminton Championships
All England
All England Open Badminton Championships in London
All England Badminton Championships
All England Badminton Championships
All England Badminton Championships